Operation Xcellerator was an operation conducted by the U.S. Drug Enforcement Administration, with cooperation from Mexican and Canadian authorities, against Sinaloa Cartel drug traffickers. In February 2009, after a 21-month operation, it totalled 755 suspects arrested across California, Minnesota, and Maryland.

A large-scale meth laboratory was also uncovered, as was an ecstasy lab capable of producing 12,000 pills per hour.

References

2009 in the United States
Drug Enforcement Administration operations
Operations against organized crime in Mexico
Operations against organized crime in the United States
Sinaloa Cartel